The Allen House in Bon Secour, Alabama is a Creole cottage built around 1880.  It was listed on the National Register of Historic Places in 1988.  It may also have been known as the Marshall House.

It is located off County Route 10 on the north bank of the Bon Secour River.

A different house, James Allen House, built about 1840, also on the Bon Secour River, was built of logs and has been updated over the years.

References

National Register of Historic Places in Baldwin County, Alabama
Houses completed in 1880